The 2005–06 Baylor Bears men's basketball team represented the Baylor University in the 2005–06 NCAA Division I men's basketball season. The team's head coach was Scott Drew, who served in his third year. The team played its home games at the Ferrell Center in Waco, Texas as members of the Big 12 Conference. Baylor did not play its season opener until January 2006. The unusually late date for a Division I program's season opener came because the NCAA restricted them to conference games only due to the Baylor University basketball scandal.

Schedule and results

|-
!colspan=9 style="background:#; color:#;"|Regular season

|-
! colspan=9 style="background:#004834; color:#FDBB2F;" | Big 12 tournament

References 

Baylor
Baylor Bears men's basketball seasons